Carlos Cabral Junior, also known as Junior Cabral, is a songwriter, producer, and arranger. Multiple Latin Grammy and Grammy Award winner, as well as music director for several Award-Winning World Tours. Latin Grammy nominations include; Album Of The Year, Record Of The Year, Best Vocal Pop Album, Best Ranchero Album, Best Norteño Album, Best Tejano Album, Best Vallenato Album. As producer/arranger/guitarist, Cabral has collaborated in more than 20 top #15 Billboard charting albums and singles.

Career
Beginning in 1995 with La Trampa by Ana Bárbara, and after moving from Brazil to Mexico, Junior began his career as a producer in the Latin market. He then continued to work with Artists such as Intocable, Juan Gabriel, Lucero, Ana Gabriel, Nydia Rojas, Lucía Méndez, Julio Iglesias, Rocio Durcal, Pepe Aguilar, and Vicente Fernandez. In 2000, the start of his relationship with Ricardo Arjona resulted in his arrangement contribution to the album Galeria Caribe. Following the success of this album, Junior produced Arjona's top charting Album; Santo Pecado. Since then, he has collaborated as a producer/arranger and engineer in almost every album released by Arjona.

In 2002 and 2003 Junior produced Ana Bárbara #1 album Te Atrapare...Bandido, Ricardo Arjona's singles "El Problema" and "Minutos", the Santo Pecado album by Ricardo Arjona. From there on, Junior has produced top-selling and top-charting albums for Sony Music Latin, Universal Music, and Warner Music.

As a producer, arranger and guitarist he's been credited in more than 200 albums and has received +30 Latin Grammy Nominations and 5 Grammy Award Nominations, of which he has won 5 Latin Grammys and 1 Grammy Award for the album Adentro by Ricardo Arjona.

Discography
Ricardo Arjona
Galeria Caribe
Santo Pecado
Adentro
Quinto Piso
Poquita Ropa
Independiente
Apague la luz y escuche
Carlos Rivera

 Leyendas (Amor Eterno con Rocío Dúrcal)

Juan Gabriel
Celebrando 
Rocio Durcal
Alma Ranchera
Duetos
Intocable
Intimamente...
Crossroads
X
Jose Jose
Ranchero
Lucía Méndez
Canta un Homenaje a Juan Gabriel
Ana Bárbara
Te atraparé... Bandido,
Loca de amar, 
No es brujería
Lucero
Aquí Estoy
Ana Gabriel
Vivencias
Felipe Peláez
Diferente
Shaila Dúrcal
Shaila Dúrcal
Pedro Fernandez

 ¡Arránquense Muchachos!

Awards

Latin Grammy Awards

Grammy Awards

Billboard Charts

Yearly charts (El Problema by Ricardo Arjona)

Decade-End charts

References

Sources
 http://www.allmusic.com/artist/carlos-cabral-jr-mn0000141148
 http://www.allmusic.com/artist/carlos-junior-cabral-mn0000794043
 https://books.google.com/books?id=SA0EAAAAMBAJ&pg=PA20
 http://www.expocompositores.com/carlos-cabral-jr-panelista-confirmado-en-la-ponencia-productores-arquitectos-exitos/
 http://www.billboard.com/artist/278987/ana-b-rbara/biography 
 http://www.allmusic.com/album/adentro-mw0000258567/credits
 https://www.discogs.com/es/Ricardo-Arjona-Adentro/release/1518451
 https://www.discogs.com/es/artist/1266274-Carlos-Cabral
 Latin Grammy Award for Best Norteño Album
 :es:Íntimamente (álbum de Intocable)
 :es:Cruce de caminos (%C3%A1lbum de Intocable)
 :es:Íntimamente (álbum de Intocable)

Year of birth missing (living people)
Living people
Brazilian record producers
Brazilian songwriters